Turid Revfeim (born 1961) is a New Zealand ballet dancer, choreographer, artistic director and ballet tutor.

Early life and education 
Revfeim was born in Auckland. Revfeim is a graduate of the New Zealand School of Dance, having begun her studies there in 1979.

Work 
She joined the Royal New Zealand Ballet (RNZB) in 1980, dancing Giselle and The Nutcracker. Revfeim was a soloist at the Theater de Stadt Koblenz in Germany for four years.

Revfeim retired from dancing in 1999 to become the artistic co-ordinator and then Ballet Mistress of RNZB. Revfeim wrote a history of the New Zealand School of Dance, celebrating its 50th anniversary in 2017. 

In 2020, she founded dance company BalletCollective Aotearoa. She is artistic director and producer. The company premiered with Subtle Dances at the Bruce Mason Theatre in Takapuna, Auckland in April 2021.

Bibliography

References 

New Zealand dancers
New Zealand dance teachers
New Zealand School of Dance alumni
Royal New Zealand Ballet dancers
1961 births
Living people